Pierre Lake is a lake in Cochrane District in northeastern Ontario,  Canada.

See also
List of lakes in Ontario

References
 National Resources Canada

Lakes of Cochrane District